Real-time optimally adapting mesh (ROAM) is a continuous level of detail algorithm that optimizes terrain meshes. On modern computers, sometimes it is more effective to send a small amount of unneeded polygons to the GPU, rather than burden the CPU with LOD (Level of Detail) calculations—making algorithms like geomipmapping more effective than ROAM. This technique is used by graphics programmers
in order to produce high quality displays while being able to maintain real-time frame rates. Algorithms such as ROAM exist to provide a control over scene quality versus performance in order to provide HQ scenes while retaining real-time frame rates on hardware. ROAM largely aims toward terrain visualization, but various elements from ROAM are difficult to place within a game system.

To assist regional geological mapping, more abundant and visualized expression forms are highly needs. Thus, the 3D terrain model is adopted as the carrier for the demands in many correlative fields. Based on the regular grid DEM (Digital Elevation Model) in DRGS, ROAM algorithm is applied to create a more dynamic model, which will give consideration to the importance of different features and select correspondence level of detail.

Original Paper 
The algorithm was introduced in the paper " ROAMing Terrain: Real-time Optimally Adapting Meshes" appearing in the Proceedings of IEEE Visualization 1997. The authors are
Mark Duchaineau
Murray Wolinsky
David E. Sigeti
Mark C. Miller
Charles Aldrich
Mark B. Mineev-Weinstein

See also 
 Geomipmapping

References

External links
ROAM:Terrain Visualization in Games
ROAM homepage
ROAM white paper (PDF)
Fast Terrain Rendering using Geometrical Mipmapping Willem H. de Boer

Computer graphics algorithms